Beatie is a name. Notable people with the name include:

 Thomas Beatie, (born 1974), American public speaker, author, and advocate with transgender and sexuality issues
 Beatie Deutsch (née Rabin; born 1989), Haredi Jewish American-Israeli marathon runner
 Beatie Edney (born 1962), English television actress
 Beatie Wolfe, Anglo-American singer-songwriter

See also
 Savas Beatie, California-based book publishing company
 Beattie (surname)
 Beaty (surname)
 Beatty (surname)